The 1930 Rhode Island gubernatorial election was held on November 4, 1930. Incumbent Republican Norman S. Case defeated Democratic nominee Theodore F. Green with 50.53% of the vote.

General election

Candidates
Major party candidates
Norman S. Case, Republican
Theodore F. Green, Democratic

Other candidates
Charles H. Dana, Socialist

Results

References

1930
Rhode Island
Gubernatorial